Bacup Cricket Club, based at Lanehead in Bacup, Lancashire, are a cricket club in the Lancashire League.

The club started in 1892 when the Lancashire League was formed. Their professional for the 2008 season was Chris Harris. Their captain for the 2018 season is Aaron Fielding and their professional is Ernest Kemm. In their history, they have won the league championship 10 times and the cup 6 times.

The 2019 1st XI captain is Aaron Fielding and the professional for the year is 31-year-old Sri Lankan all rounder Serasinghe Pathiranage Sachithra Chaturanga a right-handed batsman and right-arm off-break bowler.

Honours
1st XI League Winners - 10 - 1899, 1921, 1923, 1924, 1930, 1958, 1960, 2000, 2001, 2002
Worsley Cup Winners - 6 - 1923, 1927, 1930, 1956, 1972, 1993
Ron Singleton Colne Trophy Winners - 3 - 2001, 2002, 2003
2nd XI League Winners - 6 - 1951, 1955, 1960, 1962, 1988, 1989
2nd XI (Lancashire Telegraph) Cup Winners - 2 - 1977, 1990
3rd XI League Winners - 1 - 1996

Lancashire League cricket clubs
Sport in the Borough of Rossendale
1892 establishments in England
Cricket in Lancashire